EPL Limited (formerly Essel Propack Limited) is a global tube-packaging company owned by The Blackstone Group headquartered in Mumbai. It is a specialty packaging manufacturer of laminated plastic tubes for the FMCG and Pharma space.

In 2013, Essel Propack employed more than 2,600 people, and operated 24 facilities in 11 countries, selling more than six billion tubes each year and was the world's largest plastic tubes manufacturer. As of 2009, the company had a global market share of 33% in the toothpaste tube packaging industry.

History
The company was formed from the merger of two pre-existing companies, Essel Packaging and Propack AG led by then CEO Cyrus Bagwadia.

In 2002, Essel Propack set up a 60,000 sq.ft, US$15 Million manufacturing plant in Danville, Virginia, to make toothpaste tubes for Procter & Gamble's North American market. In the same year, the company set up its fourth plant in China.

The company was acquired by The Blackstone Group in 2019 during an assets sale of the debt-ridden Essel Group. The company was renamed to EPL Limited in October 2020.

References

Multinational companies headquartered in India
Plastics companies of India
Manufacturing companies based in Mumbai
Essel Group
The Blackstone Group companies
Packaging companies of India
Companies listed on the Bombay Stock Exchange
Companies listed on the National Stock Exchange of India
2019 mergers and acquisitions
1982 establishments in Maharashtra
Indian companies established in 1982